In geometry, a cupola is a solid formed by joining two polygons, one (the base) with twice as many edges as the other, by an alternating band of isosceles triangles and rectangles. If the triangles are equilateral and the rectangles are squares, while the base and its opposite face are regular polygons, the triangular, square, and pentagonal cupolae all count among the Johnson solids, and can be formed by taking sections of the cuboctahedron, rhombicuboctahedron, and rhombicosidodecahedron, respectively.

A cupola can be seen as a prism where one of the polygons has been collapsed in half by merging alternate vertices.

A cupola can be given an extended Schläfli symbol  representing a regular polygon  joined by a parallel of its truncation,  or 

Cupolae are a subclass of the prismatoids.

Its dual contains a shape that is sort of a weld between half of an -sided trapezohedron and a -sided pyramid.

Examples

The above-mentioned three polyhedra are the only non-trivial convex cupolae with regular faces: The "hexagonal cupola" is a plane figure, and the triangular prism might be considered a "cupola" of degree 2 (the cupola of a line segment and a square). However, cupolae of higher-degree polygons may be constructed with irregular triangular and rectangular faces.

Coordinates of the vertices

The definition of the cupola does not require the base (or the side opposite the base, which can be called the top) to be a regular polygon, but it is convenient to consider the case where the cupola has its maximal symmetry, Cnv. In that case, the top is a regular n-gon, while the base is either a regular 2n-gon or a 2n-gon which has two different side lengths alternating and the same angles as a regular 2n-gon. It is convenient to fix the coordinate system so that the base lies in the xy-plane, with the top in a plane parallel to the xy-plane. The z-axis is the n-fold axis, and the mirror planes pass through the z-axis and bisect the sides of the base. They also either bisect the sides or the angles of the top polygon, or both. (If n is even, half of the mirror planes bisect the sides of the top polygon and half bisect the angles, while if n is odd, each mirror plane bisects one side and one angle of the top polygon.) The vertices of the base can be designated V1 through V2n, while the vertices of the top polygon can be designated V2n+1 through V3n. With these conventions, the coordinates of the vertices can be written as:
V2j−1: (rb cos[2π(j − 1) / n + α], rb sin[2π(j − 1) / n + α], 0)
V2j: (rb cos(2πj / n − α), rb sin(2πj / n − α), 0)
V2n+j: (rt cos(πj / n), rt sin(πj / n), h)

where j = 1, 2, ..., n.

Since the polygons V1V2V2n+2V2n+1, etc. are rectangles, this puts a constraint on the values of rb, rt, and α. The distance V1V2 is equal to
rb{[cos(2π / n − α) − cos α]2 + [sin(2π / n − α) − sin α]2}
= rb{[cos2(2π / n − α) − 2cos(2π / n − α)cos α + cos2 α] + [sin2(2π / n − α) − 2sin(2π / n − α)sin α + sin2 α]}
= rb{2[1 − cos(2π / n − α)cos α − sin(2π / n − α)sin α]}
= rb{2[1 − cos(2π / n − 2α)]}

while the distance V2n+1V2n+2 is equal to
rt{[cos(π / n) − 1]2 + sin2(π / n)}
= rt{[cos2(π / n) − 2cos(π / n) + 1] + sin2(π / n)}
= rt{2[1 − cos(π / n)]}.

These are to be equal, and if this common edge is denoted by s,
rb = s / {2[1 − cos(2π / n − 2α)]}
rt = s / {2[1 − cos(π / n)]}

These values are to be inserted into the expressions for the coordinates of the vertices given earlier.

Star-cupolae 

Star cupolae exist for all bases  where 6/5 < n/d < 6 and d is odd. At the limits the cupolae collapse into plane figures: beyond the limits the triangles and squares can no longer span the distance between the two polygons (it can still be made if the triangles or squares are irregular.). When d is even, the bottom base {2} becomes degenerate: we can form a cuploid or semicupola by withdrawing this degenerate face and instead letting the triangles and squares connect to each other here. In particular, the tetrahemihexahedron may be seen as a {3/2}-cuploid. The cupolae are all orientable, while the cuploids are all nonorientable. When  > 2 in a cuploid, the triangles and squares do not cover the entire base, and a small membrane is left in the base that simply covers empty space. Hence the {5/2} and {7/2} cuploids pictured above have membranes (not filled in), while the {5/4} and {7/4} cuploids pictured above do not.

The height h of an -cupola or cuploid is given by the formula
. In particular, h = 0 at the limits of  = 6 and  = , and h is maximized at  = 2 (the triangular prism, where the triangles are upright).

In the images above, the star cupolae have been given a consistent colour scheme to aid identifying their faces: the base -gon is red, the base -gon is yellow, the squares are blue, and the triangles are green. The cuploids have the base -gon red, the squares yellow, and the triangles blue, as the other base has been withdrawn.

Anticupola

An n-gonal anticupola is constructed from a regular 2n-gonal base, 3n triangles as two types, and a regular n-gonal top. For n = 2, the top digon face is reduced to a single edge. The vertices of the top polygon are aligned with vertices in the lower polygon. The symmetry is Cnv, order 2n.

An anticupola can't be constructed with all regular faces,  although some can be made regular. If the top n-gon and triangles are regular, the base 2n-gon can not be planar and regular. In such a case, n=6 generates a regular hexagon and surrounding equilateral triangles of a snub hexagonal tiling, which can be closed into a zero volume polygon with the base a symmetric 12-gon shaped like a larger hexagon, having adjacent pairs of colinear edges.

Two anticupola can be augmented together on their base as a bianticupola.

Hypercupolae
The hypercupolae or polyhedral cupolae are a family of convex nonuniform polychora (here four-dimensional figures), analogous to the cupolas. Each one's bases are a Platonic solid and its expansion.

See also 
 Orthobicupola
 Gyrobicupola
 Rotunda

References

Johnson, N.W. Convex Polyhedra with Regular Faces. Can. J. Math. 18, 169–200, 1966.

External links

 Segmentotopes

Polyhedra
Prismatoid polyhedra
Johnson solids